Zafarnamah Ranjit Singh (ظفرنامہ رنجیت سنگھ) is a chronicle of the victories of Maharaja Ranjit Singh (reigned: 1801–1839), written by Diwan Amar Nath.

Text 
The original text was in the Persian language. It came in four parts. The first part has 41 chapters and is the most important section. It describes events of Singh's reign through 1837. In most cases, these are eyewitness accounts.

Part II contains descriptions of the principal gardens around Lahore. This section was included at Singh's express wish. The third part is mainly a love poem and alludes to episodes in the lives of Mirza Akram Baig and Ilahi Bakhsh. The latter rose to the rank of general in the Sikh artillery. A long poem in the fourth part honors the Maharaja.

Publication 
The original Persian text was published in 1928 by Professor Sita Ram Kohli in Lahore. A Punjabi text (in the Gurmukhi alphabet) was published 1983 in Patiala, India.

Sources 
 Zafarnama e Ranjeet Singh - Divan Amarnath (Farsi)

References 

Sikh Empire
Ranjit Singh
Indian manuscripts
19th-century Indian books
Lahore
Persian literature